Armando de Armas Romero (November 27, 1914 – May 25, 1981) was a Cuban painter.

De Armas studied between 1957 and 1959 at the Escuela de Artes y Oficios in Havana, Cuba; but is considered a self-taught artist. Between 1930 and 1950 he worked as postal employee, construction worker and trader in Havana, Cuba. He was also a scenographer with Manolo Roig of the Teatro Martí, Havana, Cuba between 1957 and 1959.

Individual exhibitions
 1975 - "Exposición de Paisajes de Armando de Armas" at the Galería de La Rampa, Hotel Habana Libre, Havana, Cuba
 1978 - "Paisajes Cubanos del Pintor Armando de Armas", at the Casa de la Cultura de Plaza, Havana, Cuba.

Collective exhibitions
 1972 - "III Trienal de Arte Insito (Naif)" at the Slovak National Gallery in Bratislava, Czechoslovakia
1972–1973 - "8 Primitive Painters", Copenhagen, Denmark; Belgrade, Yugoslavia; Prague, Czechoslovakia; Warsaw, Poland; Pushkin Museum, Moscow, Russia; Szépmúvészeti Museum, Budapest, Hungary; Bucharest, Romania; and Sofia, Bulgaria.
 1976 - “Eleven Cuban Primitive Artist”; Expo de Jamaica, Kingston, Jamaica
 1978 - "11 Pintores Ingenuos de Cuba" at the Palacio de Bellas Artes in Mexico City, México
 1982 - "Artistas Populares de Cuba" in Museo Nacional de Bellas Artes de La Habana

Collections
His works can be found in the permanent collection of:
 Museo Nacional de Bellas Artes de La Habana, Cuba.

References
 Sujatha Fernandes; Cuba Represent!: Cuban Arts, State Power, and the  Making of New Revolutionary Cultures(Duke University Press, 2006)
  Jose Veigas-Zamora, Cristina Vives Gutierrez, Adolfo V. Nodal, Valia Garzon, Dannys Montes de Oca; Memoria: Cuban Art of the 20th Century; (California/International Arts Foundation 2001); 
 Jose Viegas; Memoria: Artes Visuales Cubanas Del Siglo Xx; (California International Arts 2004);

External links

 Emilio Ichikoa webpage on artist

1914 births
1981 deaths
Artists from Havana
Cuban contemporary artists
Cuban painters
Modern painters